NetTop is an NSA project to run Multiple Single-Level systems with a Security-Enhanced Linux host running VMware with Windows as a guest operating system.

NetTop has .

External links
NSA web page on NetTop
VMware PR page on NetTop
HP NetTop web page
TCS Trusted Workstation based on NetTop

Linux security software
National Security Agency operations